Wacław Bogucki (1884  19 December 1937) was a Polish revolutionary, Soviet  politician and high-ranking official of Communist International who served as the First Secretary of the Communist Party of Byelorussia from 1922 to 1924.

Biography 
He was born in Buraków (in Gmina Łomianki). A metal worker, he joined the Social Democratic Party of the Kingdom of Poland and Lithuania (SDPiL), which was led by Rosa Luxemburg and Leo Jogiches, in 1904 in Zakopane in the Austrian ruled part of Poland. As an active party member, he was arrested eight times, and spent four years in prison. In 1910, he emigrated to the US, where he joined a group of Polish social democratic workers. He moved to Russia in 1912. After the February Revolution, in 1917, he set up a social democrat organisation among exiled Polish workers in Tiflis, in Georgia, and was elected to the Tiflis soviet. In 1918, he joined the Communist Party (CP) of Belorussia (Belarus), and was arrested while Belarus was under German occupation. but soon escaped and moved to Grodno, where he was elected chairman of the Grodno CP, and of the Grodno soviet. In 1919, he was elected to the Central Committee of the Communist Party of Lithuania and Belorussia. In 1921 - after the Soviet government had recognised Lithuania's independence - he was appointed a secretary of the Belorussian CP. In 1924, he was Belorussian People's Commissar for the Interior, but later that year. was transferred to the Polish section of Comintern, and appointed a candidate member of Comintern's Praesidium, and represented Comintern at congresses of the Polish CP in the late 1920s. He was a member of the Central Committee of the Polish Communist Party from 1925 to 1930. In 1930-37, he worked in the office the Chief Prosecutor of the USSR. He was arrested in September 1937, during the Polish operation of the NKVD, and was sentenced to death on 19 December, and shot the same day.

Family 
Bogucki's wife, Michalina Nowicka, was an Old Bolshevik, born in 1896, who worked in the TASS news agency, and as a librarian at the Lenin Institute. She was arrested soon after her husband, and spent eight years in labour camps. Their 13-year-old son, Vladimir, was sent to an orphanage. When she was released, she searched for her son, but could not find him, because he had been caught stealing a watermelon and a cantaloupe when he was hungry, and had been sentenced to ten years in a labour camp. She died in a retirement home "lonely and sick".

References 

1884 births
1937 deaths
People from Warsaw West County
People from Warsaw Governorate
Social Democracy of the Kingdom of Poland and Lithuania politicians
Congress Poland emigrants to the United States
Soviet people of Polish descent
Central Executive Committee of the Soviet Union members
Byelorussian Soviet Socialist Republic people
Polish Comintern people
Executed communists
Executed revolutionaries
People executed by the Soviet Union by firearm
Great Purge victims from Poland